Julián Andrés Díaz Villamil (born in Quibdó, Chocó. January 21, 1989) is a Colombian footballer. He currently plays for Atlético Nacional.

He can play as right back or defensive midfielder. He is also a member of the Colombian Youth National team and was recently promoted to the Athletico Nacional first team.

External links
 Atletico Nacional Official Website

1989 births
Living people
Colombian footballers
Footballers from Medellín
Atlético Nacional footballers
Association football defenders